Eryngium baldwinii is a biennial aromatic herb in the Eryngium genus. Its common name is Baldwin's eryngo. It can grow to become a spread out groundcover with hazy appearing light blue flowers. It is named for Willliam Baldwin.

Ethnobotanist Dan Austin reports that it was used as breath freshener with aphrodisiac qualities and in an edible form was known as “kissing comfits". It is in the Apiaceae family along with parsley, celery, and carrot. Several other species of Eryngium are related. It prefers lots of sun and moist to wet soil. It grows in much of Florida and parts of Georgia.

References

baldwinii